Richard Masato Aoki ( or ; November 20, 1938 – March 15, 2009) was an American educator and college counselor, best known as a civil rights activist and early member of the Black Panther Party. He joined the early Black Panther Party and was eventually promoted to the position of Field Marshal.  Although there were several Asian Americans in the Black Panther Party, Aoki was the only one to have a formal leadership position. Following Aoki's death, the Federal Bureau of Investigation's records on him were obtained through the Freedom of Information Act, showing that, over a period of 15 years, he had been an informant for the government.

Biography
Richard Aoki was born in San Leandro, California in 1938 to Japanese parents Shozo Aoki and Toshiko Kaniye. He and his family were interned at the Topaz War Relocation Center in Utah from 1942 to 1945 due to Executive Order 9066. They moved to Oakland, California, a predominantly black neighborhood, after World War II ended. In junior high Aoki joined a gang, later would brag that he was a great street fighter, and still managed to become co-valedictorian. Later, in a deal to expunge his criminal record, Aoki spent one year in active duty serving in the United States Army, first as a medic and later in the infantry, and 7 years in the reserves. In this time he became proficient in firearms. During his time in the reserves he was elected to The Berkeley Young Socialist Alliance's executive council and was a member of other socialist groups, reporting the information he gathered back to the FBI.

He attended Merritt College for two years, where he became close friends with his longtime acquaintances Huey Newton and Bobby Seale, the founding members of the Black Panther Party; the organization was founded in October 1966, one month after Aoki transferred to the University of California, Berkeley. He graduated with a bachelor's degree in sociology in 1968 and a Master of Social Work degree in 1970.

It was originally reported that Aoki died at his home in Berkeley from complications from dialysis.  Nearly a year later, it was publicly revealed that he had died of suicide from a self-inflicted gunshot wound. He never married and had no children. His life was chronicled in the 2009 documentary film, Aoki.

Posthumous revelation as an FBI informant 
On August 20, 2012, a report by Center for Investigative Reporting journalist Seth Rosenfeld alleged Aoki was an FBI informant who had infiltrated chapters of the Communist Party, the Socialist Workers' Party and, nearly from its inception, the Black Panther Party. In response to a FOIA request by Rosenfeld, it was revealed that a November 16, 1967, FBI intelligence report listed Aoki as an informant with the code number "T-2". Former FBI agent turned banker, Burney Threadgill Jr.,  also said that he worked with Aoki, stating, "He was my informant. I developed him."

On September 7, 2012, the Center for Investigative Reporting published a second story about Aoki with new documents detailing his 221-page informant file. The file was released under court order after a Freedom of Information Act lawsuit. The second story notes Aoki was designated the code name "Richard Ford." The file details 16 years of cooperation between Aoki and the FBI's San Francisco office. According to the story, the records show "that at various points, he provided information that was 'unique' and of 'extreme value.'"

Footnotes

Further reading

 Diane C. Fujino, Samurai Among Panthers: Richard Aoki on Race, Resistance, and a Paradoxical Life. Minneapolis, MN: University of Minnesota Press, 2012.

External links
Official website for Aoki, A Film Documentary(includes video clips from film) 
 Was Bay Area Radical, Black Panther Arms Supplier Richard Aoki An Informant for the FBI? from Democracy Now! August 23, 2012

1938 births
2009 deaths
2009 suicides
People from San Leandro, California
Asian-American movement activists
Japanese-American civil rights activists
Members of the Black Panther Party
COINTELPRO targets
Japanese-American internees
Activists from Oakland, California
Federal Bureau of Investigation informants
Suicides by firearm in California